Carlo Karges (31 July 1951 – 30 January 2002) was a German musician who became a guitarist and songwriter for the rock band, Nena. He wrote the lyrics of Nena's most famous song, "99 Luftballons", released in 1983. He was attending a 1982 Rolling Stones concert at the Waldbühne (the "Forest Theatre") in West Berlin, when they released a large mass of helium balloons into the air. He wondered how East German or Soviet forces might react if the balloons crossed the Berlin Wall, and thus he conceived the idea for the song about a major war resulting from misidentification of a mass of balloons. 

Karges was born in Hamburg and grew up with his single mother there. As a student he started to play guitar and to compose songs. After he had gathered experience playing live in several different groups, including Tomorrows Gift and Release Music Orchestra, by 1971 he was the guitarist and keyboardist and founding member of Novalis.

In 1981 he joined Gabriele "Nena" Kerner, Rolf Brendel, Jürgen Dehmel, and Uwe Fahrenkrog-Petersen in establishing the eponymous band Nena.

Karges died at the Eppendorf Clinic in Hamburg on 30 January 2002 at the age of 50, due to liver failure. He was buried in Hamburg's Ohlsdorf Cemetery.

References

External links 
 
 

1951 births
2002 deaths
German new wave musicians
German rock guitarists
German male guitarists
German songwriters
Musicians from Hamburg
20th-century guitarists
Deaths from liver failure
Burials at the Ohlsdorf Cemetery
20th-century German male musicians
20th-century German musicians
Nena (band) members